Ronald Barrera (born 12 October 1984) is a Colombian professional boxer who currently fights in the flyweight division and has fought for major world titles five times, losing each attempt.

World title challenges
On March 4, 2006 Barrera lost to Yutaka Niida by unanimous decision for the WBA minimumweight world title.

On April 28, 2007 Barrera lost to Iván Calderón by split decision for the WBO minimumweight world title.

On April 11, 2009 Barrera lost to Raúl García by sixth round technical knockout for the IBF minimumweight world title.

On December 18, 2009 Barrera lost to Juan Carlos Reveco by third round knockout for the interim WBA light flyweight world title.

On September 4, 2010 Barrera lost to Omar Niño Romero by seventh round technical decision for the WBC light flyweight world title.

Other notable fighters faced
On January 21, 2012 Barrera lost to Julio Ceja by fourth round knockout.

On September 9, 2012 Barrera lost to Carlos Cuadras by seventh round technical knockout.

On May 25, 2013 Barrera lost to Román González by fifth round technical knockout in a bantamweight bout.

Professional boxing record

References

External links 
 

1984 births
Living people
Colombian male boxers
Bantamweight boxers
Light-flyweight boxers
Mini-flyweight boxers